U-69 may refer to one of the following German submarines:

 , a Type U 66 submarine launched in 1915 and that served in the First World War until sunk after 11 July 1917
 During the First World War, Germany also had these submarines with similar names:
 , a Type UB III submarine launched in 1917 and sunk on 9 January 1918
 , a Type UC II submarine launched in 1916 and sunk on 6 December 1917
 , a Type VIIC submarine that served in the Second World War until sunk on 17 February 1943

Submarines of Germany